Primaluna (Valassinese ) is a comune (municipality) in the Province of Lecco in the Italian region Lombardy, located about  northeast of Milan and about  north of Lecco.

Primaluna borders the following municipalities: Casargo, Cortenova, Crandola Valsassina, Esino Lario, Introbio, Pasturo, Premana.

Twin towns
Primaluna is twinned with:

  La Roche-Vineuse, France

References

External links
 Official website

Cities and towns in Lombardy
Valsassina